The Behrang railway station is a Malaysian train station stationed at the south-eastern side of and named after the town of Behrang, Perak. The station was reopened and electrified in 2007.  At one end of this station, there is a freight yard. It was made prior to the Rawang-Ipoh Electrified Double Tracking Project. Currently, this station is not in used as the ETS railway service does not stop here.

Location and locality 
It is located at Behrang Stesen town in Behrang, in Muallim district of Perak, Malaysia. It was intended to serve Behrang areas as well as Sultan Azlan Shah Polytechnic nearby, but due to close distance from nearby Tanjung Malim station which also offers Komuter services to Klang Valley areas, it didn't manage to catch as much passenger it targets to.

See also
 Rail transport in Malaysia

KTM ETS railway stations